NOAAS Bell M. Shimada (R 227) is an American fisheries research ship in commission with the National Oceanic and Atmospheric Administration (NOAA) since 2010. She operates along the United States West Coast.

The ship was named by students at Marina High School in Marina, California, who won a NOAA vessel-naming contest held as part of an educational outreach program. The ship's namesake, Bell M. Shimada (1922-1958), served with the United States Fish and Wildlife Service and the Inter-American Tropical Tuna Commission, and was known for his studies of tropical Pacific tuna stocks.

Construction and commissioning 
Bell M. Shimada was laid down by Halter Marine, Inc., at Moss Point, Mississippi, on 15 June 2007 and launched on 26 September 2008. On 21 January 2010, Halter Marine delivered her to NOAA, which commissioned her on 25 August 2010.

Characteristics and capabilities 

Capable of conducting multidisciplinary oceanographic operations in support of biological, chemical, and physical process studies, Bell M. Shimada was commissioned as the fourth of a class of five of the most advanced fisheries research vessels in the world, with a unique capability to conduct both fishing and oceanographic research. She is a stern trawler with fishing capabilities similar to those of commercial fishing vessels. Her most advanced feature is the incorporation of United States Navy-type acoustic quieting technology to enable NOAA scientists to monitor fish populations without the ships noise altering the behavior of the fish, including advanced quieting features incorporated into her machinery, equipment, and propeller. Her oceanographic hydrophones are mounted on a retractable centerboard, or drop keel, that lowers scientific transducers away from the region of hull-generated flow noise, enhancing the quality of the data collected. To take full advantage of these advanced data-gathering capabilities, she has the Scientific Sonar System, which can accurately measure the biomass of fish in a survey area. She also has an Acoustic Doppler Current Profiler with which to collect data on ocean currents and a multibeam sonar system that provides information on the content of the water column and on the type and topography of the seafloor while she is underway, and she can gather hydrographic data at any speed up to 11 knots (20 km/hr).

She has a  knuckle boom and a  telescopic boom. The oceanographic winch and large after A-frame work in conjunction to serve her stern sampling station, while two winches work with the starboard-side A-frame to service her side sampling station, and Bell M. Shimadas configuration allows her to have three scientific packages ready for sequential operations. One of her winches also can deploy lines and equipment over her stern. In addition to trawling, her sampling stations can deploy smaller sampling nets, longlines, and fish traps. Her winches can deploy CTD instruments to measure the electrical conductivity, temperature, and chlorophyll fluorescence of sea water. Bell M. Shimada also can deploy specialized gear such as Multiple Opening/Closing Net and Environmental Sensing System (MOCNESS) frames, towed vehicles, dredges, and bottom corers, and she can deploy and recover both floating and bottom-moored sensor arrays. While trawling, Reuben Lasker uses wireless and hard-wired systems to monitor the shape of the trawl net and to work in conjunction with an autotrawl system that sets trawl depth and trawl wire tension and adjusts the net configuration.

Bell M. Shimada has a 591-square-foot (sq. ft.) (54.9-square-meter) (m2) wet laboratory, a 206-sq.-ft. (19.1-m2) dry laboratory, a 270-sq.-ft. (25.1-m2) chemistry laboratory, a 474-sq.-ft. (44.0-m2) electronics and computer laboratory, and a 179-sq.-ft. (16.6-m2) hydrographic laboratory. She also has a 61-sq.-ft. (5.7-m2) climate-controlled space, a 402-sq.-ft. (37.3-m2) walk-in scientific freezer, a 9-sq.-ft. (0.8-m2) scientific chest freezer, a 55-sq.-ft. (5.1-m2) scientific refrigerator, and a 65-sq.-ft. (6.0-m2) store room. She has open deck space aft for fishing and scientific operations and another area of open deck space at the side sampling station on her starboard side. All of her discharge pipes empty off her port side so that fluids discharged will not contaminate samples collected at the station on her starboard side.

Bell M. Shimada carries a 26-foot 6-inch (8.1-meter) SOLAS-approved rescue boat with a 144-horsepower (122-kilowatt) motor and a capacity of six people.

In addition to her crew of 24, Bell M. Shimada can accommodate up to 15 scientists.

Service history

Officially classified as a "fisheries survey vessel" and with her home port at Newport, Oregon, Bell M. Shimada operates in support of the Northwest Fisheries Science Center in Seattle, Washington, and the Southwest Fisheries Science Center in La Jolla, California, both components of NOAA's National Marine Fisheries Service. She operates along the entire United States West Coast, conducting both oceanographic and fisheries research. She monitors fisheries and protected species including albacore, sharks, salmon, groundfish, sardines, and hake, makes weather observations, conducts habitat assessments, and surveys marine mammal and marine bird populations.

When NOAA commissioned the fisheries survey vessel NOAAS Reuben Lasker (R 228) – home-ported at San Diego, California – in May 2014 and assigned her to surveys of fish, marine mammals, and sea turtles off the U.S. West Coast and in the eastern tropical Pacific Ocean, Bell M. Shimada was freed to focus on high-priority projects that prior to Reuben Laskers arrival had been allocated no dedicated sea time, including studies of the California Current Large Marine Ecosystem between British Columbia and Baja California and of salmon populations all along the U.S. West Coast.

Notes

External links

NOAA Ship Bell M. Shimada website
Step Aboard America’s Most Advanced Ocean Research Vessel - Wired.com

Ships of the National Oceanic and Atmospheric Administration
Fisheries science
Ships built in Moss Point, Mississippi
2008 ships